Golestan (also Romanized as Golestān) is a village in Azghand Rural District, Shadmehr District, Mahvelat County, Razavi Khorasan Province, Iran. At the 2006 census, its population was 479, in 102 families.

References 

Populated places in Mahvelat County